Cardeston is a small settlement in Shropshire, England. It is part of the civil parish of Alberbury with Cardeston. It has no facilities, apart from a Church of England church.

See also
Listed buildings in Alberbury with Cardeston

References

External links

Cardeston at Streetmap.co.uk

Villages in Shropshire